Shanghai Pierce may refer to:

 Mark Canterbury, American wrestler
 Abel Head "Shanghai" Pierce (1834-1900), Texas rancher and cattleman